Ira Black (born March 23, 1971) is an American heavy metal guitarist. He has played in over 60 bands since the early 1980s and is best known for his work with I Am Morbid, Westfield Massacre, Metal Church, Vicious Rumors, Heathen, Lizzy Borden and Dokken.

Black has been a strict vegan for 20 years. While in LA County jail in 2009 on a traffic violation, Black garnered national media attention by going on a 10-day hunger strike when he was refused vegan meals.

Career 
Black joined Lizzy Borden with Metal Blade Records, and played Dean Guitars.  He played guitars on the album Appointment with Death in 2007, with writing credit on half the songs.

He recorded "Send in the Clowns" for Carrot Top's Stage Show at the Luxor in Las Vegas with singer Paul Shortino, Tyler Burgess and drummer Vinnie Paul Abbott with Tom Parham.

Black was recruited to cover Phil Demmel's guitar parts for the Vio-lence touring schedule beginning in August 2022. Demmel had a greater obligation to tour with Lamb of God, and will return to Vio-lence as he becomes available.

References 

1971 births
Living people
American heavy metal guitarists
Musicians from Sacramento, California
American male guitarists
Guitarists from California
21st-century American guitarists
21st-century American male musicians
Heathen (band) members